The Fauvel AV.46 was a (AV for aile volante was a 2-seat tail-less motor-glider designed, but not built, in France. The AV.46 was derived from the single-seat Fauvel AV.45, fitted with a dual tandem cockpit similar to the Fauvel AV.22.

Specifications

References

Tailless aircraft
Flying wings
Fauvel aircraft